Anoplomerus is a genus of beetles in the family Cerambycidae, containing the following species:

 Anoplomerus buqueti Belon, 1890
 Anoplomerus globulicollis Buquet, 1860
 Anoplomerus rotundicollis Guérin-Méneville, 1844

References

Hesperophanini